Workgroup may refer to:

 Courtroom Workgroup, an informal arrangement between a criminal prosecutor, criminal defense attorney, and the judicial officer
 Workgroup (computer networking), a peer-to-peer computer network
 Working group, a group of people working together toward a common goal 
 Work Group, American record label